Littlejohn Island is an island and census-designated place (CDP) in the town of Yarmouth in Cumberland County, Maine, United States. The population of the CDP was 118 at the 2010 census.

It is part of the Portland–South Portland–Biddeford, Maine Metropolitan Statistical Area.

The island, Cousins River and Cousins Island are named after Englishman John Cousins (–1682), who emigrated from Marlborough, Wiltshire.

Geography
It is connected by a causeway to Cousins Island, which is connected by a bridge to the mainland in Yarmouth.

Demographics

References

Census-designated places in Maine
Islands of Cumberland County, Maine
Portland metropolitan area, Maine
Landforms of Yarmouth, Maine
Islands of Maine
Islands of Casco Bay